Klunkerz: A Film About Mountain Bikes is a 2006 documentary about mountain bike history during its formative period in Northern California. It examines the relationships of the Marin County hippies, athletes, and entrepreneurs who were directly responsible for popularizing off-road cycling. The film includes many interviews with those present during the embryonic stages of the sport, including Gary Fisher, Charlie Kelly, Joe Breeze, Tom Ritchey, Mike Sinyard, and Otis Guy, and covers "the treacherous old Repack races." The film was written, produced, and directed by independent California filmmaker Billy Savage and released on October 8, 2006.

Festivals and awards
Awards
"2009 Cycling Film of the Year" (Competitor Film Festival, San Diego)
"Make Your Own Legends Award" (Boulder Adventure Film Festival)
2007 "Documentary - Feature Jury Commendation" (Durango Independent Film Festival)

Festivals - Official Selection
2006 Mill Valley Film Festival
2007 Durango Independent Film Festival
2007 Newport Beach Film Festival
San Luis Obispo Film Festival
2007 Bicycle Film Festival (New York City, NY)
Competitor Film Festival (San Diego)
International Bicycling Film Festival (Sydney and Melbourne, Australia)
2008 International Cycling Video Festival (Bochum, Germany)

References

External links
 
 
"Who Really Invented the Mountain Bike?" BikeRadar.com, Oct. 2007
 Fat Tire Flyer, a book about the first mountain bikes by Charlie Kelly

2006 films
American sports documentary films
Hippie films
Mountain biking films
Films set in the San Francisco Bay Area
Cycling in the San Francisco Bay Area
Documentary films about cycling
2006 documentary films
2000s English-language films
2000s American films